Groh is a surname. Notable people with the surname include:

 Al Groh (born 1944), head coach of the University of Virginia college football team
 Christian Groh, American billionaire businessman
 David Groh (1939–2008), American film and television actor
 Heinie Groh (1889–1968), American baseball player
 Jürgen Groh (born 1956), German soccer player

See also
 Great rhombihexahedron, also known as groh, a nonconvex uniform polyhedron